The 1998 Ms. Olympia contest was an IFBB professional bodybuilding competition was held on October 24, 1998, in Prague, Czech Republic. It was the 19th Ms. Olympia competition held.

Prize money
 1st $50,000

Results
 1st - Kim Chizevsky-Nicholls
 2nd - Yolanda Hughes
 3rd - Vickie Gates
 5th - Lesa Lewis
 5th - Laura Creavalle
 6th - Andrulla Blanchette
 7th - Jitka Harazimova
 8th - Eva Sukupova
 9th - Chris Bongiovanni
 10th - Yaxeni Oriquen-Garcia
 11th - Gayle Moher
 12th - Valentina Chepiga
 13th - Zdenka Tvrda
 14th - Dayana Cadeau
 15th - Jackie DeGennaro
 16th - Beate Drabing
 17th - Sipka Berska

Scorecard

See also
 1998 Mr. Olympia

References

 Ms. Olympia held in Prague, Czech Republic on October 25th
 1998 Ms Olympia Results

External links
 Competitor History of the Ms. Olympia

Ms Olympia, 1998
1998 in bodybuilding
Ms. Olympia
Ms. Olympia
History of female bodybuilding